Thaddeus Gustav Dixon (born January 14, 1984), also known as The Music Man, is an American record producer, songwriter, music director, and musician. He is noted for co-producing and co-writing Meghan Trainor's certified platinum’s  single "Better When I'm Dancin'". The song was recorded for The Peanuts Movie soundtrack.

Dixon has also worked as a music director and drummer for Bryson Tiller, Khalid and other artists. He has been featured on television shows including Making His Band and Late Night with Seth Meyers. In addition, he has performed at the White House and Carnegie Hall.

Early life and education 
Dixon was born in Detroit, Michigan, the only child of Gus and Denise Dixon. He began playing drums at 4 years old and honed his skills as a church musician. He attended Detroit High School for Fine & Performing Arts, and played at local concerts for gospel artists including Kirk Franklin.

After graduating high school, Dixon moved to East Lansing, Michigan to attend Michigan State University (MSU) on a jazz studies scholarship. He was recruited by MSU jazz studies director, Rodney Whitaker who lauded him for having "the stuff you can't teach." He took on professional gigs while pursuing his degree, and graduated in 2006 with a Bachelor of Music.

Career 
Dixon began his professional career as a touring drummer with The Spinners. Thereafter, he performed with artists including Ne-Yo, Sean Kingston, Mulgrew Miller, Roy Hargrove and Steve Nelson. He later appeared on MTV's "Making His Band", a reality TV show where musicians competed for positions in Sean Combs' touring band. He was a drum finalist, however another musician was ultimately selected. 
Dixon then worked with acts including Deitrick Haddon, Bone Thugs-n-Harmony, Dawn Richard and Timothy Bloom. He also performed with his own jazz ensemble, The Thaddeus Dixon Quartet. He then relocated to Berkeley to work as an instructor in the music department at the University of California, Berkeley for two years.

Dixon later became the music director for recording artist Cody Simpson. He then managed music direction for Meghan Trainor, Bryson Tiller, Khalid and Brent Faiyaz. He also produced music for Meghan Trainor, Talib Kweli, Raekwon, Timothy Bloom, Deborah Cox, Teedra Moses and Rick Ross among others. In October 2018, he released his debut single, "Letter To My X's" featuring KR.

Production credits

2011 
Deitrick Haddon - Church on the Moon
 (Drums)
21:03 - Evolved...from Boys to Men
 (Drums)
Disney Jazz, Vol. 1: Everybody Wants to Be a Cat
 (Drums)
Robert McCarther - Stranger in Town
 (Drums)
Rick Roe - Minor Shuffle
 (Drums)

2013 
Talib Kweli - Gravitas
 "Violations" feat. Raekwon (Producer)

2014 
Timothy Bloom - Timothy Bloom
"Your Future" (Composer, Drums, Producer, Programming)
Teedra Moses - California Vibes
 "Can’t Be Luv" (Producer) 
Abrina – My Playground (EP)
 "Blowin" feat. Jeremih (Producer)

2015 
The Peanuts Movie Original Soundtrack
"Better When I'm Dancin'" (Backwards Vocals, Producer, Text)
Deborah Cox - Work of Art
"More Than I Knew" (Producer)
Teedra Moses - Cognac & Conversation
 "All I Ever Wanted" feat. Rick Ross (Composer, Engineer, Producer)
 "Cognac & Conversation" feat. Rick Ross (Composer, Engineer, Producer)
Coco Jones
 "Let Em Know" (Producer)

2016 
Thaddeus Dixon feat. Timothy Bloom and Talib Kweli
 "All About You" (Producer)
Taeyeon – Rain
 "Secret" (Composer, Arrangement)
MÄDA
 "Lights Off" (Producer)
 "Without U Baby" (Producer)

2017 
MÄDA - Our Love (EP)
 "I Still Love You" feat. Dreezy (Producer)

2018 
Thaddeus Dixon feat. KR
 "Letter To My X's" (Primary Artist, Composer, Engineer, Producer)

References

External links 
Thaddeus Dixon Official Website

Living people
Record producers from Michigan
Songwriters from Michigan
American audio engineers
Musicians from Detroit
Jazz musicians from Michigan
African-American jazz musicians
American music educators
Michigan State University alumni
1984 births
Educators from Michigan
African-American songwriters
21st-century African-American people
20th-century African-American people